This page lists all described species of the spider family Liocranidae accepted by the World Spider Catalog :

A

Agraecina

Agraecina Simon, 1932
 A. agadirensis Lecigne, Lips, Moutaouakil & Oger, 2020 — Morocco
 A. canariensis Wunderlich, 1992 — Canary Is.
 A. cristiani (Georgescu, 1989) — Romania
 A. hodna Bosmans, 1999 — Algeria
 A. lineata (Simon, 1878) (type) — Western Mediterranean to Kazakhstan
 A. rutilia (Simon, 1897) — Sierra Leone
 A. salsicola Bosmans & Boubakri, 2020 — Tunisia
 A. scupiensis Deltshev, 2016 — North Macedonia, Greece

Agroeca

Agroeca Westring, 1861
 A. agrestis Ponomarev, 2007 — Kazakhstan
 A. annulipes Simon, 1878 — Spain, France (Corsica), Italy (Sardinia), Morocco, Algeria
 A. aureoplumata Keyserling, 1879 — Colombia
 A. batangensis Mu, Jin & Zhang, 2019 — China
 A. bonghwaensis Seo, 2011 — Korea
 A. brunnea (Blackwall, 1833) — Europe, Turkey, Russia (Europe to Far East), China, Japan
 A. coreana Namkung, 1989 — Russia (Far East), China, Korea, Japan
 A. cuprea Menge, 1873 — Europe, Caucasus, Russia (Europe to South Siberia), Iran, Central Asia
 A. debilis O. Pickard-Cambridge, 1885 — China (Yarkand)
 A. dentigera Kulczyński, 1913 — Europe, Turkey, China
 A. dubiosissima (Strand, 1908) — Peru
 A. flavens O. Pickard-Cambridge, 1885 — China (Yarkand)
 A. gangotrae Biswas & Roy, 2008 — India
 A. guttulata Simon, 1897 — Central Asia
 A. inopina O. Pickard-Cambridge, 1886 — Europe, Algeria
 A. istia de Biurrun & Barrientos, 2021 — Spain
 A. kamurai Hayashi, 1992 — China, Japan
 A. kastoni Chamberlin & Ivie, 1944 — USA
 A. lata Mu, Jin & Zhang, 2019 — China
 A. lusatica (L. Koch, 1875) — Europe, Russia (Europe to South Siberia), Kazakhstan, Iran
 A. maculata L. Koch, 1879 — Russia (Europe to Far East), Kazakhstan
 A. maghrebensis Bosmans, 1999 — Morocco, Algeria, Tunisia
 A. mainlingensis Mu, Jin & Zhang, 2019 — China
 A. makarovae Esyunin, 2008 — Russia (Europe)
 A. minuta Banks, 1895 — USA
 A. mongolica Schenkel, 1936 — Mongolia, China, Korea
 A. montana Hayashi, 1986 — Russia (Far East), China, Korea, Japan
 A. nigra Mu, Jin & Zhang, 2019 — China
 A. ornata Banks, 1892 — USA, Canada, Russia (Middle Siberia to Far East)
 A. parva Bosmans, 2011 — Greece, Turkey, Israel
 A. pratensis Emerton, 1890 — USA, Canada
 A. proxima (O. Pickard-Cambridge, 1871) (type) — Europe, Turkey, Russia (Europe to South Siberia)
 A. spinifera Kaston, 1938 — USA
 A. trivittata (Keyserling, 1887) — USA
 A. tumida Mu, Jin & Zhang, 2019 — China

Andromma

Andromma Simon, 1893
 A. aethiopicum Simon, 1893 (type) — Ethiopia
 A. anochetorum Simon, 1909 — Congo, East Africa
 A. bouvieri Fage, 1936 — Kenya
 A. raffrayi Simon, 1899 — South Africa
 A. r. inhacorense Lessert, 1936 — Mozambique

Apostenus

Apostenus Westring, 1851
 A. algericus Bosmans, 1999 — Algeria
 A. annulipedes Wunderlich, 1987 — Canary Is.
 A. annulipes Caporiacco, 1935 — Karakorum
 A. californicus Ubick & Vetter, 2005 — USA
 A. crespoi Lissner, 2017 — Portugal
 A. ducati Bennett, Copley & Copley, 2013 — USA, Canada
 A. fuscus Westring, 1851 (type) — Europe
 A. gomerensis Wunderlich, 1992 — Canary Is.
 A. grancanariensis Wunderlich, 1992 — Canary Is.
 A. humilis Simon, 1932 — Portugal, Spain, France
 A. maroccanus Bosmans, 1999 — Morocco
 A. ochraceus Hadjissarantos, 1940 — Greece
 A. palmensis Wunderlich, 1992 — Canary Is.
 † A. arnoldorum Wunderlich, 2004 
 † A. bigibber Wunderlich, 2004 
 † A. spinimanus Koch and Berendt, 1854

Arabelia

Arabelia Bosselaers, 2009
 A. pheidoleicomes Bosselaers, 2009 (type) — Greece, Turkey

Argistes

Argistes Simon, 1897
 A. seriatus (Karsch, 1892) — Sri Lanka
 A. velox Simon, 1897 (type) — Sri Lanka

C

Coryssiphus

Coryssiphus Simon, 1903
 C. cinerascens Simon, 1903 — South Africa
 C. praeustus Simon, 1903 (type) — South Africa
 C. unicolor Simon, 1903 — South Africa

Cteniogaster

Cteniogaster Bosselaers & Jocqué, 2013
 C. conviva Bosselaers & Jocqué, 2013 — Tanzania
 C. hexomma Bosselaers & Jocqué, 2013 — Kenya
 C. lampropus Bosselaers & Jocqué, 2013 — Tanzania
 C. nana Bosselaers & Jocqué, 2013 — Tanzania
 C. sangarawe Bosselaers & Jocqué, 2013 — Tanzania
 C. taxorchis Bosselaers & Jocqué, 2013 — Tanzania
 C. toxarchus Bosselaers & Jocqué, 2013 (type) — Tanzania

Cybaeodes

Cybaeodes Simon, 1878
 C. alicatai Platnick & Di Franco, 1992 — Tunisia
 C. avolensis Platnick & Di Franco, 1992 — Italy (Sicily)
 C. carusoi Platnick & Di Franco, 1992 — Algeria
 C. dosaguas Ribera & De Mas, 2015 — Spain
 C. indalo Ribera & De Mas, 2015 — Spain
 C. liocraninus (Simon, 1913) — Algeria
 C. madidus Simon, 1914 — France
 C. magnus Ribera & De Mas, 2015 — Spain
 C. mallorcensis Wunderlich, 2008 — Spain (Majorca)
 C. marinae Di Franco, 1989 — Italy
 C. molara (Roewer, 1960) — Italy (Sicily)
 C. sardus Platnick & Di Franco, 1992 — Italy (Sardinia)
 C. testaceus Simon, 1878 (type) — France, Corsica

D

Donuea

Donuea Strand, 1932
 D. collustrata Bosselaers & Dierick, 2010 — Madagascar
 D. decorsei (Simon, 1903) (type) — Madagascar

H

Hesperocranum

Hesperocranum Ubick & Platnick, 1991
 H. rothi Ubick & Platnick, 1991 (type) — USA

J

Jacaena

Jacaena Thorell, 1897
 J. angoonae Dankittipakul, Tavano & Singtripop, 2013 — Thailand
 J. aspera Mu & Zhang, 2020 — China
 J. bannaensis Mu & Zhang, 2020 — China (incl. Hainan)
 J. distincta Thorell, 1897 (type) — Myanmar
 J. erawan (Deeleman-Reinhold, 2001) — Thailand
 J. jinxini Liu & Xu, 2020 — China
 J. lunulata Dankittipakul, Tavano & Singtripop, 2013 — Thailand
 J. luteola Mu & Zhang, 2020 — China
 J. menglaensis Mu & Zhang, 2020 — China
 J. mihun Deeleman-Reinhold, 2001 — Thailand
 J. peculiaris Dankittipakul, Tavano & Singtripop, 2013 — Thailand
 J. punctata Dankittipakul, Tavano & Singtripop, 2013 — Thailand
 J. schwendingeri (Deeleman-Reinhold, 2001) — Thailand
 J. tengchongensis Zhao & Peng, 2013 — China
 J. thakek (Jäger, 2007) — Laos
 J. zhui (Zhang & Fu, 2011) — China, Thailand

K

Koppe

Koppe Deeleman-Reinhold, 2001
 K. armata (Simon, 1896) — Sri Lanka
 K. baerti Deeleman-Reinhold, 2001 — Indonesia (Sulawesi)
 K. calciphila Deeleman-Reinhold, 2001 — Indonesia (Sulawesi)
 K. doleschalli Deeleman-Reinhold, 2001 — Indonesia (Moluccas)
 K. kinabalensis Deeleman-Reinhold, 2001 — Borneo
 K. kuntneri Deeleman-Reinhold, 2001 — Indonesia (Moluccas)
 K. minuta Deeleman-Reinhold, 2001 — Indonesia (Java, Sumatra)
 K. montana Deeleman-Reinhold, 2001 (type) — Indonesia (Java)
 K. no Deeleman-Reinhold, 2001 — Indonesia (Sulawesi)
 K. princeps Deeleman-Reinhold, 2001 — Indonesia (Sulawesi)
 K. radiata (Thorell, 1881) — New Guinea
 K. sumba Deeleman-Reinhold, 2001 — Indonesia (Lesser Sunda Is.)
 K. tinikitkita (Barrion & Litsinger, 1995) — Philippines

L

Laudetia

Laudetia Gertsch, 1941
 L. dominicana Gertsch, 1941 (type) — Dominica
 L. insularis (Petrunkevitch, 1930) — Puerto Rico
 L. portoricensis (Petrunkevitch, 1930) — Puerto Rico

Liocranoeca

Liocranoeca Wunderlich, 1999
 L. emertoni (Kaston, 1938) — USA
 L. spasskyi Ponomarev, 2007 — Ukraine, Russia (Europe)
 L. striata (Kulczyński, 1882) (type) — Europe, Russia (Europe to South Siberia)
 L. vjosensis Komnenov, 2018 — Albania

Liocranum

Liocranum L. Koch, 1866
 L. apertum Denis, 1960 — Spain, France
 L. concolor Simon, 1878 — France (Corsica)
 L. erythrinum (Pavesi, 1883) — Ethiopia
 L. freibergi Charitonov, 1946 — Uzbekistan
 L. giersbergi Kraus, 1955 — Italy (Sardinia)
 L. inornatum (L. Koch, 1882) — Spain (Majorca)
 L. kochi Herman, 1879 — Slovakia
 L. majus Simon, 1878 — Spain
 L. nigritarse L. Koch, 1875 — Ethiopia
 L. perarmatum Kulczyński, 1897 — Slovenia, Croatia
 L. pulchrum Thorell, 1881 — New Guinea
 L. remotum Bryant, 1940 — Cuba
 L. rupicola (Walckenaer, 1830) (type) — Europe, Turkey, Armenia, Russia (Europe to West Siberia)
 L. segmentatum Simon, 1878 — France

Liparochrysis

Liparochrysis Simon, 1909
 L. resplendens Simon, 1909 (type) — Australia (Western Australia)

M

Mesiotelus

Mesiotelus Simon, 1897
 M. annulipes (Kulczyński, 1897) — Slovakia, Hungary, Croatia, Serbia, Bulgaria, Turkey, Ukraine
 M. cyprius Kulczyński, 1908 — Cyprus
 M. deltshevi Naumova, 2020 — Albania
 M. grancanariensis Wunderlich, 1992 — Portugal, Canary Is., Madeira
 M. kulczynskii Charitonov, 1946 — Central Asia
 M. libanicus (Simon, 1878) — Lebanon
 M. lubricus (Simon, 1880) — China
 M. maderianus Kulczyński, 1899 — Madeira
 M. mauritanicus Simon, 1909 — Mediterranean
 M. pococki Caporiacco, 1949 — Kenya
 M. scopensis Drensky, 1935 — North Macedonia, Bulgaria, Greece, Turkey, Iran
 M. tenellus (Thorell, 1875) — Italy
 M. tenuissimus (L. Koch, 1866) (type) — Europe, North Africa, Turkmenistan
 M. viridis (L. Koch, 1867) — Greece (incl. Crete)
 M. zonsteini Mikhailov, 1986 — Central Asia

Mesobria

Mesobria Simon, 1898
 M. guttata Simon, 1898 (type) — St. Vincent

N

Neoanagraphis

Neoanagraphis Gertsch & Mulaik, 1936
 N. chamberlini Gertsch & Mulaik, 1936 (type) — USA, Mexico
 N. pearcei Gertsch, 1941 — USA

O

Oedignatha

Oedignatha Thorell, 1881
 O. adhartali (Gajbe, 2003) — India
 O. affinis Simon, 1897 — Sri Lanka
 O. albofasciata Strand, 1907 — India
 O. aleipata (Marples, 1955) — Samoa
 O. andamanensis (Tikader, 1977) — India (Andaman Is.)
 O. barbata Deeleman-Reinhold, 2001 — Thailand
 O. bicolor Simon, 1896 — Sri Lanka
 O. binoyii Reddy & Patel, 1993 — India
 O. bucculenta Thorell, 1897 — Myanmar
 O. canaca Berland, 1938 — Vanuatu
 O. carli Reimoser, 1934 — India
 O. coriacea Simon, 1897 — Sri Lanka
 O. dentifera Reimoser, 1934 — India
 O. escheri Reimoser, 1934 — India
 O. ferox (Thorell, 1897) — Myanmar
 O. flavipes Simon, 1897 — Sri Lanka
 O. gulosa Simon, 1897 — Sri Lanka
 O. indica (Tikader, 1981) — India
 O. indica Reddy & Patel, 1993 — India
 O. jocquei Deeleman-Reinhold, 2001 — Thailand
 O. lesserti Reimoser, 1934 — India
 O. major Simon, 1896 — Sri Lanka
 O. microscutata Reimoser, 1934 — India
 O. mogamoga Marples, 1955 — Malaysia, Indonesia (Borneo). Introduced to Seychelles, Samoa
 O. montigena Simon, 1897 — Sri Lanka
 O. platnicki Song & Zhu, 1998 — China (Hong Kong), Taiwan
 O. poonaensis Majumder & Tikader, 1991 — India
 O. proboscidea (Strand, 1913) — Sri Lanka
 O. procerula Simon, 1897 — India
 O. raigadensis Bastawade, 2006 — India
 O. retusa Simon, 1897 — Sri Lanka
 O. rugulosa Thorell, 1897 — Myanmar
 O. scrobiculata Thorell, 1881 (type) — India, Thailand, Malaysia, Philippines, Indonesia, Taiwan. Introduced to Madagascar, Seychelles, Reunion, Germany
 O. shillongensis Biswas & Majumder, 1995 — India
 O. sima Simon, 1886 — Thailand
 O. spadix Deeleman-Reinhold, 2001 — Indonesia (Sulawesi, Lesser Sunda Is.)
 O. striata Simon, 1897 — Sri Lanka
 O. tricuspidata Reimoser, 1934 — India
 O. uncata Reimoser, 1934 — India

P

† Palaeospinisoma

† Palaeospinisoma Wunderlich, 2004
 † P. femoralis Wunderlich, 2004

Paratus

Paratus Simon, 1898
 P. halabala Zapata & Ramírez, 2010 — Thailand
 P. hamatus Mu & Zhang, 2018 — China
 P. indicus Marusik, Zheng & Li, 2008 — India
 P. kentingensis Mu & Zhang, 2018 — Taiwan
 P. longlingensis Zhao & Peng, 2013 — China
 P. perus Sankaran, Malamel, Joseph & Sebastian, 2017 — India
 P. reticulatus Simon, 1898 (type) — Sri Lanka
 P. sinensis Marusik, Zheng & Li, 2008 — China

Platnick

Platnick Marusik & Fomichev, 2020
 P. astana Marusik & Fomichev, 2020 — Tajikistan
 P. sanglok Marusik & Fomichev, 2020 — Tajikistan
 P. shablyai Marusik & Fomichev, 2020 (type) — Tajikistan

R

Rhaeboctesis

Rhaeboctesis Simon, 1897
 R. denotatus Lawrence, 1928 — Angola, Namibia
 R. equestris Simon, 1897 (type) — South Africa
 R. exilis Tucker, 1920 — South Africa
 R. matroosbergensis Tucker, 1920 — South Africa
 R. secundus Tucker, 1920 — South Africa
 R. transvaalensis Tucker, 1920 — South Africa
 R. trinotatus Tucker, 1920 — South Africa

S

Sagana

Sagana Thorell, 1875
 S. rutilans Thorell, 1875 (type) — Europe, Caucasus (Russia, Georgia)

Scotina

Scotina Menge, 1873
 S. celans (Blackwall, 1841) — Europe, Algeria
 S. gracilipes (Blackwall, 1859) (type) — Europe
 S. occulta Kritscher, 1996 — Malta
 S. palliardii (L. Koch, 1881) — Europe, Turkey, Korea

Sesieutes

Sesieutes Simon, 1897
 S. aberrans Dankittipakul & Deeleman-Reinhold, 2013 — Thailand
 S. abruptus Dankittipakul & Deeleman-Reinhold, 2013 — Malaysia
 S. apiculatus Dankittipakul & Deeleman-Reinhold, 2013 — Indonesia
 S. bifidus Dankittipakul & Deeleman-Reinhold, 2013 — Malaysia
 S. borneensis Deeleman-Reinhold, 2001 — Borneo, Sulawesi, Philippines
 S. bulbosus Deeleman-Reinhold, 2001 — Borneo
 S. emancipatus Deeleman-Reinhold, 2001 — Malaysia
 S. longyangensis Zhao & Peng, 2013 — China
 S. lucens Simon, 1897 (type) — Malaysia, Singapore
 S. minor Deeleman-Reinhold, 2001 — Borneo
 S. minuatus Dankittipakul & Deeleman-Reinhold, 2013 — Thailand
 S. nitens Deeleman-Reinhold, 2001 — Indonesia (Java, Sumatra)
 S. scrobiculatus Deeleman-Reinhold, 2001 — Indonesia (Sumatra)

Sphingius

Sphingius Thorell, 1890
 S. barkudensis Gravely, 1931 — India, Bangladesh
 S. bifurcatus Dankittipakul, Tavano & Singtripop, 2011 — Thailand, Malaysia
 S. bilineatus Simon, 1906 — India
 S. caniceps Simon, 1906 — India
 S. deelemanae Zhang & Fu, 2010 — China
 S. elongatus Dankittipakul, Tavano & Singtripop, 2011 — Thailand
 S. gothicus Deeleman-Reinhold, 2001 — Thailand
 S. gracilis (Thorell, 1895) — China, Myanmar
 S. hainan Zhang, Fu & Zhu, 2009 — China
 S. nilgiriensis Gravely, 1931 — India
 S. octomaculatus Deeleman-Reinhold, 2001 — Thailand
 S. paltaensis Biswas & Biswas, 1992 — India
 S. penicillus Deeleman-Reinhold, 2001 — Thailand
 S. prolixus Dankittipakul, Tavano & Singtripop, 2011 — Thailand
 S. punctatus Deeleman-Reinhold, 2001 — Thailand to Indonesia (Lesser Sunda Is.)
 S. rama Dankittipakul, Tavano & Singtripop, 2011 — Thailand
 S. scrobiculatus Thorell, 1897 — China, Taiwan, Myanmar, Thailand
 S. scutatus Simon, 1897 — Sri Lanka
 S. songi Deeleman-Reinhold, 2001 — Thailand
 S. spinosus Dankittipakul, Tavano & Singtripop, 2011 — Thailand, Malaysia, Indonesia (Sumatra)
 S. superbus Dankittipakul, Tavano & Singtripop, 2011 — Thailand, Malaysia
 S. thecatus Thorell, 1890 (type) — Malaysia
 S. tristiculus Simon, 1903 — Vietnam
 S. vivax (Thorell, 1897) — Myanmar, Thailand, Vietnam, Malaysia, Philippines
 S. zhangi Zhang, Fu & Zhu, 2009 — China

Sudharmia

Sudharmia Deeleman-Reinhold, 2001
 S. beroni Deeleman-Reinhold, 2001 — Indonesia (Sumatra)
 S. pongorum Deeleman-Reinhold, 2001 (type) — Indonesia (Sumatra)
 S. tridenticula Dankittipakul & Deeleman-Reinhold, 2012 — Indonesia (Sumatra)

T

Teutamus

Teutamus Thorell, 1890
 T. andrewdavisi Deeleman-Reinhold, 2001 — Borneo
 T. apiculatus Dankittipakul, Tavano & Singtripop, 2012 — Malaysia
 T. brachiatus Dankittipakul, Tavano & Singtripop, 2012 — Thailand, Malaysia
 T. calceolatus Dankittipakul, Tavano & Singtripop, 2012 — Malaysia
 T. christae Ono, 2009 — Vietnam
 T. deelemanae Dankittipakul, Tavano & Singtripop, 2012 — Malaysia
 T. fertilis Deeleman-Reinhold, 2001 — Indonesia (Sumatra)
 T. globularis Dankittipakul, Tavano & Singtripop, 2012 — Malaysia
 T. hirtellus Dankittipakul, Tavano & Singtripop, 2012 — Philippines
 T. jambiensis Deeleman-Reinhold, 2001 — Indonesia (Sumatra)
 T. leptothecus Dankittipakul, Tavano & Singtripop, 2012 — Malaysia
 T. lioneli Dankittipakul, Tavano & Singtripop, 2012 — Malaysia
 T. orthogonus Dankittipakul, Tavano & Singtripop, 2012 — Indonesia (Sumatra)
 T. poggii Dankittipakul, Tavano & Singtripop, 2012 — Indonesia (Sumatra)
 T. politus Thorell, 1890 (type) — Thailand, Malaysia
 T. rama Dankittipakul, Tavano & Singtripop, 2012 — Thailand, Malaysia
 T. rhino Deeleman-Reinhold, 2001 — Indonesia (Java)
 T. rollardae Dankittipakul, Tavano & Singtripop, 2012 — Indonesia (Sumatra)
 T. rothorum Deeleman-Reinhold, 2001 — Indonesia (Java)
 T. seculatus Dankittipakul, Tavano & Singtripop, 2012 — Malaysia, Indonesia
 T. serrulatus Dankittipakul, Tavano & Singtripop, 2012 — Malaysia
 T. spiralis Dankittipakul, Tavano & Singtripop, 2012 — Borneo
 T. sumatranus Dankittipakul, Tavano & Singtripop, 2012 — Indonesia (Sumatra)
 T. tortuosus Dankittipakul, Tavano & Singtripop, 2012 — Indonesia (Sumatra)
 T. vittatus Deeleman-Reinhold, 2001 — Borneo

Toxoniella

Toxoniella Warui & Jocqué, 2002
 T. nyeri Oketch & Li, 2021 — Kenya
 T. rogoae Warui & Jocqué, 2002 — Kenya
 T. taitensis Warui & Jocqué, 2002 (type) — Kenya
 T. tharaka Oketch & Li, 2021 — Kenya
 T. waruii Oketch & Li, 2021 — Kenya

V

Vankeeria

Vankeeria Bosselaers, 2012
 V. catoptronifera Bosselaers, 2012 (type) — Greece

X

Xenoplectus

Xenoplectus Schiapelli & Gerschman, 1958
 X. armatus Schiapelli & Gerschman, 1958 (type) — Argentina

References

Liocranidae